William Singer Moorhead (April 8, 1923 – August 3, 1987) was an American politician serving as a Democratic member of the U.S. House of Representatives from the Commonwealth of Pennsylvania.

Moorhead was born in Pittsburgh, Pennsylvania, the son of prominent attorney William Singer Moorhead, Sr (1883–1952).  He attended Shady Side Academy, graduated from Phillips Andover Academy in 1941 and from Yale University in 1944, where he was a member of Skull and Bones.

He served in the United States Navy from 1943 until he was discharged as a lieutenant (jg.) in 1946 with service in the Pacific Theater. Moorhead married the former Lucy Galpin, and they had four children. He graduated from Harvard Law School in 1949.  He served as Assistant City Solicitor of Pittsburgh from 1954 to 1957, as a member of Allegheny County Housing Authority from 1956 to 1958, and the Pittsburgh Art Commission in 1958.

He was elected in 1958 as a Democrat to the 86th Congress and to the ten succeeding Congresses. Moorhead was a prominent critic of Pentagon cost overruns, a leader in establishing the National Endowments for the Arts and the Humanities, floor manager of freedom of information legislation that opened government documents to the public, and chief sponsor of the bill that established a synthetic fuels corporation. He also sponsored legislation to rescue New York City from its 1975 fiscal crisis.

He was not a candidate for reelection in 1980, and instead practiced law in the Washington firm of Coan, Couture, Lyons & Moorhead.

Moorhead died of lung cancer at Johns Hopkins Hospital in Baltimore in 1987; he was 64.

Sources

External links
 Guide to the William Singer Moorhead Papers at Yale University Library

1923 births
1987 deaths
Harvard Law School alumni
Politicians from Pittsburgh
Yale University alumni
Phillips Academy alumni
United States Navy personnel of World War II
Military personnel from Pittsburgh
United States Navy officers
Deaths from lung cancer
Deaths from cancer in Maryland
Democratic Party members of the United States House of Representatives from Pennsylvania
20th-century American politicians